Yonko Peykov (Bulgarian: Йонко Пейков) (born 3 August 1974) is a Bulgarian former footballer, who played for a number of professional clubs in the country, including Litex Lovech, Spartak Varna, Spartak Pleven, Vidima-Rakovski, Olympik Teteven, and Balkan Botevgrad.

References

1974 births
Living people
Association football defenders
Bulgarian footballers
First Professional Football League (Bulgaria) players
PFC Litex Lovech players
PFC Vidima-Rakovski Sevlievo players
PFC Spartak Pleven players
PFC Spartak Varna players